Vulture Glacier is located in Banff National Park, Alberta, Canada, northwest of Lake Louise, and can be viewed from the Icefields Parkway. Vulture Glacier is an outflow glacier from the Wapta Icefield, which rests along the Continental Divide.

See also
List of glaciers in Canada

References

 
 

Banff National Park
Glaciers of Alberta